Leslie Moser (June 16, 1894 – January 1, 1969) was an American college football player and coach. He was the head football coach at Wofford College from 1916 to 1917, compiling a record of 7–11. Moser played college football at Washington & Jefferson University.

Head coaching record

References

External links
 

1894 births
1969 deaths
American football centers
Washington & Jefferson Presidents football players
Wofford Terriers athletic directors
Wofford Terriers football coaches
People from Westmoreland County, Pennsylvania